Michelle Scullion (born 1957) is a New Zealand musician and composer. Several of her soundscapes are part of installations at Museum of New Zealand Te Papa Tongarewa.

Biography 
Scullion grew up in Stokes Valley, on the outskirts of Wellington, New Zealand. After high school, she studied music at Wellington Polytechnic and Victoria University of Wellington. Her first major film project was to create the score for Sir Peter Jackson's 1987 film Bad Taste. During her career, she has composed music for commercials, corporate videos, short films, documentaries and feature films. She also performs and records.

In 2003 she was a judge for the Kodak Music Clip Awards at the Wellington Fringe Film Festival.

Scullion started playing the flute when she was 13 years old and also composes music for flute. In 2011 she assembled a group of flautists to perform her works as part of the New Zealand Fringe Festival in Wellington.

Awards and recognition

References 

Victoria University of Wellington alumni
Living people
1957 births
New Zealand film score composers
People from Lower Hutt
Women film score composers
New Zealand women musicians
20th-century composers
20th-century women composers
21st-century composers
21st-century women composers